Rogvolod (920978) was the first chronicled prince of Polotsk (945–978). The name has also been connected with the Russian words рог and володеть, from which the formation of the name may have come. He was a Varangian, unrelated to Vladimir the Great, and was established at Polotsk in the mid-10th century, most likely having come from overseas (i.e., from Scandinavia or the Southern Baltic). According to the Russian Primary Chronicle, Vladimir the Great sought an alliance with him in 980 by marrying his daughter Rogneda, but she refused, insulting his parentage, and married his brother, Yaropolk. In revenge, Vladimir attacked Rogvolod and his family, killing him and his sons, after which he raped Rogneda, and forcibly took her as his bride.

References

External links
 Oleg Łatyszonek, Ales’ Bely. On the Scandinavian origin of Rahvalod // Annus Albaruthenicus/Год беларускі №6. 2005.

920 births
978 deaths
Year of birth uncertain
Fairhair dynasty
Varangians
10th-century princes in Kievan Rus'
10th-century murdered monarchs
People from Polotsk
10th-century Vikings